Velidhoo as a place name may refer to:
 Velidhoo (Alif Alif Atoll) (Republic of Maldives)
 Velidhoo (Noonu Atoll) (Republic of Maldives)